Meinl-Weston is a leading manufacturer of brass instruments, based in Geretsried in Germany and formerly based in Graslitz.

Their main brands are Melton and Meinl Weston, with current instruments bearing both logos. Despite the engraving A Division of Getzen which appears on some instruments sold in the United States, the company remains family owned and operated.

In 1991, Gerhard Meinl helped found the TA Musik group to take over Vogtländische Musikinstrumentenfabrik, the B&S brand in East Germany. The group is now known as JA Musik GmbH, and manages the Meinl-Weston, B&S, Scherzer, and Hans Hoyer brands of band instruments.

See also

 Getzen.

References

External links
 Home page.

Companies based in Bavaria
Brass instrument manufacturing companies
Musical instrument manufacturing companies of Germany